Altaír Jarabo García (born August 7, 1986, in Mexico City, Mexico) is a Mexican actress and fashion model. She is best known for her antagonistic roles in Mexican telenovelas including Inocente de ti, Al diablo con los guapos, En nombre del amor, Abismo de pasión, Mentir para vivir, Que te perdone Dios, Vencer el desamor and Corazón guerrero.
She has a brother named Jorge Jarabo Garcia.

Career
Well known as a fashion model in Mexico, Jarabo made her acting debut in 1993 in the telenovela El peñón del amaranto as Amaranta. In 2002, she appeared in Súbete a mi moto with Vanessa Acosta and Sandra Echeverría. She became popular worldwide by portraying Isela in the 2004 telenovela Inocente de ti, starring Camila Sodi and Valentino Lanús. In 2005, she appeared in El amor no tiene precio as Vanessa. In 2006, she portrayed as Afrodita Carvajal in the teenage telenovela Código Postal. In 2007, the audience saw her on Lola, érase una vez and Al diablo con los guapos. Born to an Israeli father and a Spanish mother, Altaír Jarabo became a popular actress and one of the most beautiful women in Mexico.

In 2008, Jarabo played a major role as Romina Mondragón  En nombre del amor, opposite Allisson Lozz and Sebastián Zurita. She was later cast in Mi pecado in 2009 and Llena de amor in 2010. Two years later, she had another major role in the 2012 telenovela Abismo de pasion as Florencia Landucci, an Italian boarding-school student. In 2013, she starred as Raquel Ledesma in Mentir para vivir, produced by Rosy Ocampo. In 2015, she played the antagonist Diana Montero in Que te perdone Dios, produced by Angelli Nesma Medina.

Jarabo also co-starred in the telenovela Pasión y poder, produced by José Alberto Castro. In 2018, she joined the ensemble cast of legal drama Por amar sin ley in the role of Victoria Escalante, one of the key lawyers of the Vega y Asociados law firm.

Filmography

Awards and nominations

Premios TVyNovelas

Premios Diosas de Plata

Premios People en Español

References

External links 

Official Website of Altaír Jarabo

1986 births
Living people
Mexican child actresses
Mexican telenovela actresses
Mexican television actresses
Mexican film actresses
Mexican stage actresses
Mexican female models
20th-century Mexican actresses
21st-century Mexican actresses
Actresses from Mexico City
Mexican people of Venezuelan descent